In homological algebra, the Cartan–Eilenberg resolution is in a sense, a resolution of a chain complex. It can be used to construct hyper-derived functors. It is named in honor of Henri Cartan and Samuel Eilenberg.

Definition 

 If  then the p-th column is zero, i.e.  for all q.

 For any fixed column ,

There is an analogous definition using injective resolutions and cochain complexes.

The existence of Cartan–Eilenberg resolutions can be proved via the horseshoe lemma.

Hyper-derived functors 

 Constructing a Cartan–Eilenberg resolution , 
 Taking the homology of the resulting total complex.

Similarly, one can also define right hyper-derived functors for left exact functors.

See also 
 Hyperhomology

References 
 

Homological algebra